The Birnirk culture was a prehistoric Inuit culture of the north coast of Alaska, dating from the sixth century A.D. to the twelfth century A.D. The Birnirk culture first appeared on the American side of the Bering Strait, descending from the Old Bering Sea/Okvik culture and preceding the Thule culture; it is distinguished by its advanced harpoon and marine technology.
A burial mound of the Birnirk culture was discovered in the town of Wales; 16 more have been found in Utqiagvik at the "Birnirk site," which is now a National Historic Landmark. An ancient Birnirk village has been found at present-day Ukpiaġvik.

Culture 

The Birnirk people lived in small single family dwellings containing either a long or short entrance that led to a single room with sleeping platforms. Houses lacked open fireplaces; instead, heat and light were provided by stone and clay lamps. Birnirk settlements are thought to have been small, with only a few families living in a settlement at a time. As such, the concept of the Birnirk people whaling is often debated. Most communities involved in whaling require several crews, which would have been difficult for the Birnirk as they had such small settlements. However, a whaling harpoon found in Utqiagvik, along with artifacts derived from whale parts found in other sites (baleen, whale bones, and the like) suggest that the Birnirk people were involved in some form of whale hunts. They were also known to hunt seals, caribou, birds, and fish using a variety of tools.

Tools 
A multitude of Birnirk instruments have been found. They were skilled seal hunters, known for their use of innovative equipment, such as ice scratchers to lure seals over frozen waters. They are characterized by the style of the harpoons they used for hunting seals and other marine animals; the heads of the harpoons were self-pointed and had a "single lateral barb and an opposing chipped-stone side blade inset". In addition to their harpoons, the Birnirk people were known for their use of ground slate weapons. These weapons include knives, blades, arrows, and spears, usually utilized in hunting terrestrial animals.

Genetics

A genetic study published in Science in August 2014 examined the remains of five Birnirk people buried in Siberia between ca. 570 AD and 680 AD. The five samples of mtDNA extracted all belonged to haplogroup A2a. Haplogroup A2a was also the predominant maternal lineage among the Thule people. The genetic evidence suggested that the Thule people descended from Birnirk migrants from Siberia who entered northern Canada and Greenland some time after 1300 AD, where they completely replaced the genetically distinct indigenous Dorset people.

See also 
Ipiutak site

References

Sources

 

Inuit history
Archaeological cultures of North America
Prehistory of the Arctic